Al F. Caniglia Field is a stadium located on the campus of the University of Nebraska at Omaha in Omaha, Nebraska. Beginning on October 26, 2013, it became home of the Omaha Mavericks men's and women's soccer teams. Caniglia Field seats 3,097 fans and features 1,390 chairback seats and VIP boxes. The field features a 21-foot by 42-foot LED video board and scoreboard. The Omaha soccer pitch, installed by Hellas Construction, is the only NCAA Division I field to receive the prestigious FIFA Recommended 2-Star certification. The state-of-the-art soccer-specific turf features a lower grain that allows the ball to move faster and an infill of ground coconut husks and cork to keep the on-field temperature lower.

History
The stadium was the former home of the NCAA Division II UNO Mavericks football and track teams. Prior to playing at Caniglia Field, in 1927, businessmen formed the North Omaha Activities Association in order to redevelop Saratoga School's playing field into a football field for the university's football team. With new bleachers built to accommodate a crowd of 1,000 spectators, the Saratoga Field was home to Omaha's football team until Caniglia Field opened. The first game was played on Caniglia Field on October 1, 1949, against Northern Illinois. Omaha discontinued varsity football in 2011.

The stadium also hosted two NAIA Division II football playoff games in 1990, including the national championship game, during Peru State's sole championship-winning season.

References

College football venues
College soccer venues in the United States
Nebraska–Omaha Mavericks football
Omaha Mavericks men's soccer
Sports venues in Omaha, Nebraska
American football venues in Nebraska
Soccer venues in Nebraska
1949 establishments in Nebraska
Sports venues completed in 1949
Defunct college football venues
College track and field venues in the United States